The Sansan paleontological site (locally au Campané) is a Miocene fossil deposit in Sansan, in the French department of Gers.

Searched by Edouard Lartet until 1847, it was considered utile for Science and is registered by the Inventaire national du Patrimoine Géologique (InPG) as an international-level site. It constitutes one of the most important Middle Cenozoic deposits and is well known in palaeontological circles. The National Museum of Natural History bought four hectares of terrain in 1848 and oversee any research on the site since then. The research stopped in 1999. The site has been open to the public since 2018.

Location
The paleontological site is located inside the commune of Sansan, on the Campané hill at 238 m above sea level, in the Gers department, 16 km south of Auch. The hill and its surroundings were historically called "Camp de las hossos".

Recent history
The deposits were excavated regularly from 1834 to 1999. Francis Duranthon from the Toulouse Museum and Pascal Tassy from the Paris Museum were the last researchers to have worked on Sansan, specifically on the southern flank.

Outcrops were backfilled, vegetation grew back and a paleontological trail was created in 2018 by the Communauté de communes du Val de Gers. Today, research have stopped but the site is open for public access. A 2.5 km trail, marked by interpretive panels, helps to learn how Edouard Lartet discovered the site and how his discovery revolutionized the scientific theories of the time and exposed the richness of its Miocene fauna and flora.

Species list

The site of Sansan gave 85 mammal species from 9 orders, 30 families and 75 genera, being one of the richest Miocene sites in Europe. One of the most important discoveries on the site was the description by Edouard Lartet in 1837 of Pliopithecus, a catarrhini monkey, which was a keystone in the reject of creationism by scientists and the advance towards the evolution theory.

The first fossil was discovered in 1834 by the shepherd Joseph Débats, who lived on the hilltop. It was a proboscidean molar. He told the Gers lawyer Edouard Lartet, who explored the site. The Sansan mastodont, Archaeobelodon, was entirely reconstructed in 1851 by Laurillard, a first in Europe.

Edouard Lartet describes in 1834 a large carnivore, which he named Amphicyon major.

The first fossils of the chalicothere species ''Anisodon grande were also recovered in Sansan.

The following table shows all 85 species of mammals found in Sansan.

Chiroptera

Proboscidea

Perissodactyla

Artiodactyla

Rodentia

Lagomorpha

Primates

Insectivora

Carnivora

References

External links
 
 
" Le paléosite de Sansan", Communauté de Communes Val de Gers

Geologic formations of France
Neogene System of Europe
Neogene France
Miocene
Fossiliferous stratigraphic units of Europe
Paleontology in France
Gers